Arianna  is a 2015 independent coming-of-age drama film written and directed by Carlo Lavagna.  It was entered into the competition at the Venice Days section at the 72nd Venice International Film Festival, and was awarded for Best Italian Discover and Best New Actress and won the best actress award at the Italian Golden Globes (Ondina Quadri).

For this film Lavagna was nominated for David di Donatello for Best New Director.

Plot 
Now considered a woman, Arianna (Ondina Quadri) has a social life and an academic life. There remains one thing missing from her life as a woman: her period. Constantly scrutinizing her sexual development, or lack thereof, is a daily task until the summertime when she meets Martino (Eduardo Valdarini). The summer spent at the lake with her family is used as a time for shenanigans with friends and delving deeper into the study of her body's sexuality, psychological state, and genitalia.

Cast

See also 
 List of Italian films of 2015

References

External links 
 

2015 films
2015 independent films
Italian coming-of-age drama films
Italian independent films
Italian LGBT-related films
2015 LGBT-related films
2010s coming-of-age drama films
Films about intersex
LGBT-related drama films
2015 directorial debut films
2015 drama films
2010s Italian films